Stephen R. Bartels is an American politician serving as a member of the Indiana House of Representatives from the 74th district. He assumed office on November 16, 2017.

Early life and education 
Bartels was born and raised in Southern Indiana. He attended Indiana State University and Vincennes University, but did not earn a degree.

Career 
Bartels served in the Army National Guard, reaching the rank of major. He later served as a patrolman in the Terre Haute Police Department. Bartels owns the Patoka Lake Marina and Patoka Lake Winery. He was appointed to the Indiana House of Representatives in November 2017.

References 

Living people
Republican Party members of the Indiana House of Representatives
People from Crawford County, Indiana
Year of birth missing (living people)